Henno is both a surname and a given name. Notable people with the name include:

Surname:
Hubert Henno (born 1976), French volleyball player
Olivier Henno (born 1962), French politician
Sass Henno (born 1982), Estonian writer

Given name:
Henno Althoff (born 1960), German record producer and recording engineer
Henno Haava (born 1973), Estonian runner
Henno Jordaan (born 1988), South African cricketer
Henno Käo (1942–2004), Estonian children's writer, book illustrator, poet and musician
Henno Martin (1910–1998), German geologist
Henno Mentz (born 1979), South African rugby union player
Henno Prinsloo (born 1987), Namibian cricketer

See also
Schlüssel Henno, German World War II hand-cipher system, see Reservehandverfahren
Aaron Henneman (born 1980), Australian rules footballer

Estonian masculine given names
German masculine given names